Lawley is a township in the Gauteng province of South Africa and is some 8 km south of Lenasia. Named after Sir Arthur Lawley, Lieutenant-Governor of Transvaal from 1902 to 1906, when he became Governor of Madras.

References

Johannesburg Region G
Townships in Gauteng